"Como Un Lobo" (Eng.: Like a Wolf) was first released as a single in 1988. The song was written by Miguel Bosé, G. Vanni, C. D'Onofrio, P. Costa, M. Tazzi and M. Ogletree, and was included on Bose's 1987 studio album XXX.

Miguel Bosé & Bimba Bosé version
The same song was reworked with a collaboration from Bosé's niece Bimba Bosé for his 2007 duets album Papito. On September 17, 2007 the video for this track (directed by Diego Postigo) was released.

Charts

References

2007 singles
1988 singles
1987 songs
Songs written by Miguel Bosé